William Henry Cavendish Cavendish-Bentinck, 3rd Duke of Portland,  (14 April 173830 October 1809) was a British Whig and then a Tory politician during the late Georgian era. He served as Chancellor of the University of Oxford (1792–1809) and twice as Prime Minister of Great Britain (1783) and then of the United Kingdom (1807–1809). The gap of 26 years between his two terms as Prime Minister is the longest of any British Prime Minister. He was also the fourth great-grandfather of King Charles III through his great-granddaughter Cecilia Bowes-Lyon, Countess of Strathmore and Kinghorne.

Portland was known before 1762 by the courtesy title Marquess of Titchfield. He held a title for every degree of British nobility: duke, marquess, earl, viscount, and baron. He was the leader of the Portland Whigs faction, which broke with the Whig leadership of Charles James Fox and joined with William Pitt the Younger in the wake of the French Revolution.

Early life and education
Lord Titchfield was the eldest son of William Bentinck, 2nd Duke of Portland and Margaret Cavendish-Harley and inherited many lands from his mother and his maternal grandmother, who was the daughter of John Holles, 1st Duke of Newcastle. He was educated at Westminster School and Christ Church, Oxford, where he graduated MA in 1757.

Marriage and children

On 8 November 1766, Portland married Lady Dorothy Cavendish, a daughter of William Cavendish, 4th Duke of Devonshire and Charlotte Boyle. They were parents of six children:

William Bentinck, 4th Duke of Portland (24 June 176827 March 1854).
Lord William Henry Cavendish-Bentinck (14 September 177417 June 1839).
Lady Charlotte Cavendish-Bentinck (2 October 177528 July 1862). Married Charles Greville, and they had three sons: Charles Cavendish Fulke Greville, Algernon Greville, and Henry William Greville (1801–1872), and a daughter, Harriet (1803–1870) m. Francis Egerton, 1st Earl of Ellesmere.
Lady Mary Cavendish-Bentinck (13 March 17796 November 1843).
Lord Charles Bentinck (20 May 178028 April 1826). Ancestor of the 6th and 7th dukes of Portland.
Lord Frederick Cavendish-Bentinck (2 November 178111 February 1828) married Lady Mary Lowther (died 1863), daughter of William Lowther, 1st Earl of Lonsdale, 16 September 1820; had issue: George Cavendish-Bentinck, ancestor of the 8th and 9th dukes of Portland.
A stillborn baby, birthed at Burlington House on 20 October 1786.

Political and public offices
Portland was elected to sit in the Parliament of Great Britain for Weobley in 1761 before he entered the House of Lords after he succeeded his father as Duke of Portland the next year. He was associated with the aristocratic Whig Party of Lord Rockingham and served as Lord Chamberlain of the Household in Rockingham's first government (1765–1766).

Lord Lieutenant of Ireland
Portland served as Lord Lieutenant of Ireland in Rockingham's second ministry (April–August 1782). He faced strong demands for conciliatory measures following years of coercion and taxation brought about by the British government's engagement in the American Revolutionary War.  Portland resolved to make concessions and, overcoming the resistance of Lord Shelburne, the Home Secretary to whom he reported, convinced Parliament to repeal the Declaratory Act and to modify Poynings' Law.  Following Rockingham's death, Portland resigned from Lord Shelburne's ministry along with other supporters of Charles James Fox.

First government

In April 1783, Portland was selected as the titular head of a coalition government as Prime Minister, whose real leaders were Charles James Fox and Lord North. He served as First Lord of the Treasury in the ministry until its fall in December that same year. During his tenure, the Treaty of Paris was signed, which formally ended the American Revolutionary War. The government was brought down after it had lost a vote in the House of Lords on its proposed reform of the East India Company after George III had let it be known that any peer voting for the measure would be considered his personal enemy.

In 1789, Portland became one of several vice presidents of London's Foundling Hospital. The charity had become one of the most fashionable of the time, with several notables serving on its board. At its creation, 50 years earlier, Portland's father, William Bentinck, 2nd Duke of Portland, had been one of the founding governors, as listed on the charity's royal charter granted by George II. The hospital had a mission to care for the abandoned children in London, and it achieved rapid fame through its poignant mission, its art collection donated from supporting artists and the popular benefit concerts by George Frideric Handel. In 1793, Portland took over the presidency of the charity from Lord North.

Home secretary
Along with many other conservative Whigs such as Edmund Burke, Portland was deeply uncomfortable with the French Revolution; he broke with Fox over that issue and joined Pitt's government as Secretary of State for the Home Department in 1794. In that role he oversaw the administration of patronage and financial inducements, which were often secret, to secure the passage of the Act of Union 1800. He continued to serve in the cabinet until Pitt's death in 1806, from 1801 to 1805 as Lord President of the Council and then as a Minister without Portfolio.

Second government 

In March 1807, after the collapse of the Ministry of all the Talents, Pitt's supporters returned to power, and Portland was once again an acceptable figurehead for a fractious group of ministers that included George Canning, Lord Castlereagh, Lord Hawkesbury and Spencer Perceval.

Portland's second government saw the United Kingdom's complete isolation on the continent but also the beginning of its recovery with the start of the Peninsular War. In late 1809, with Portland's health poor and the ministry rocked by the scandalous duel between Canning and Castlereagh, Portland resigned and died shortly thereafter.

He was Recorder of Nottingham until his death.

Death and burial

He died on 30 October 1809 at Burlington House, Piccadilly, after an operation for the stone, and was buried at St Marylebone Parish Church, London.

He had lived expensively: with an income of £17,000 a year (worth £577,000 in 2005), he had debts at his death computed at £52,000 (£1.76 million in 2005), which were paid off by his succeeding son by selling off some property, including Bulstrode Park.

Along with Sir Robert Peel, Lord Aberdeen, Benjamin Disraeli, Marquess of Salisbury, Sir Henry Campbell-Bannerman, Bonar Law and Neville Chamberlain, he was the first of eight British prime ministers to die while his direct successor was in office.

Legacy

The Portland Vase of Roman glass was given its name because it was owned by Portland at his family residence at Bulstrode Park.

Portland Parish, in Jamaica, was named after him. The Titchfield School, founded in 1786, is in the parish and is also named in his honour. The school's crest is derived from the his personal crest.

Two major streets in Marylebone are named after him: Portland Place and Great Portland Street. Both were built on land that he once owned.

North Bentinck Arm and South Bentinck Arm were named for the Bentinck family by George Vancouver in 1793, along with other names on the British Columbia Coast, such as Portland Canal and Portland Channel.

Portland Bay in Victoria, Australia was named in 1800 by the British navigator James Grant. The city of Portland is located on the bay.

The department of Manuscripts and Special Collections, The University of Nottingham holds a number of papers relating to him. His personal and political papers (Pw F) are part of the Portland (Welbeck) Collection, and the Portland (London) Collection (Pl) contains his correspondence and official papers, especially in series Pl C.

The Portland Estate Papers held at Nottinghamshire Archives also contain items relating to the 3rd Duke's properties.

The Portland Collection of fine and decorative art includes pieces owned and commissioned by him, including paintings by George Stubbs.

Arms

Cabinets as Prime Minister

First Ministry, April – December 1783
The Duke of Portland—First Lord of the Treasury
Lord Stormont—Lord President of the Council
Lord Carlisle—Lord Privy Seal
Lord North—Secretary of State for the Home Department
Charles James Fox—Secretary of State for Foreign Affairs
The Viscount Keppel—First Lord of the Admiralty
Lord John Cavendish—Chancellor of the Exchequer
The Viscount Townshend—Master-General of the Ordnance
Lord Northington—Lord-Lieutenant of Ireland
The Great Seal is in Commission

Second Ministry, March 1807October 1809
The Duke of Portland—First Lord of the Treasury
Lord Eldon—Lord Chancellor
Lord Camden—Lord President of the Council
Lord Westmorland—Lord Privy Seal
Lord Hawkesbury, after 1808, Lord Liverpool – Secretary of State for the Home Department
George Canning—Secretary of State for Foreign Affairs
Lord Castlereagh—Secretary of State for War and the Colonies
Lord Mulgrave—First Lord of the Admiralty
Spencer Perceval—Chancellor of the Exchequer and of the Duchy of Lancaster
Lord Chatham—Master-General of the Ordnance
Lord Bathurst—President of the Board of Trade

Changes
July 1809—Lord Harrowby, the President of the Board of Control, and Lord Granville Leveson-Gower, the Secretary at War, enter the Cabinet

Ancestry

References

External links

 William Bentinck, Duke of Portland profile on the 10 Downing Street website
 Biography of the 3rd Duke, with links to online catalogues, from Manuscripts and Special Collections, The University of Nottingham
 
 

1738 births
1809 deaths
19th-century prime ministers of the United Kingdom
People from Nottinghamshire
People educated at Westminster School, London
Alumni of Christ Church, Oxford
18th-century heads of government
19th-century heads of government
British MPs 1761–1768
British Secretaries of State
Chancellors of the University of Oxford
103
William, 3rd Duke of Portland
Knights of the Garter
Lord-Lieutenants of Nottinghamshire
Lord Presidents of the Council
Members of the Parliament of Great Britain for English constituencies
Members of the Privy Council of Great Britain
Prime Ministers of the United Kingdom
Fellows of the Royal Society
Portland, Victoria
Prime Ministers of Great Britain
British landowners
Lords Lieutenant of Ireland
Whig (British political party) MPs for English constituencies
Burials at St Marylebone Parish Church
Leaders of the House of Lords